Wabun may refer to:

 Wabun code, Japanese Morse code
 Wabun, Virginia, place in the United States
 Wabun Tribal Council, regional First Nations advisory council in Ontario, Canada
 Wabun, a wind god, further information may be found under: Anishinaabe traditional beliefs